Trichostema oblongum, known by the common names oblong bluecurls and mountain bluecurls, is a species of flowering plant in the mint family .

It is native to California and the Northwestern United States in Oregon, Idaho, and Washington, and north into British Columbia, Canada.

Its habitat includes dry margins of meadows and streambanks in Yellow pine forest, Red Fir Forest, Lodgepole pine Forest, Subalpine Forest, California mixed evergreen forest, and North Coastal Coniferous Forest plant communities.

Description
Trichostema oblongum  is an annual herb approaching  in maximum height.
Its aromatic foliage is coated in glandular and nonglandular hairs.

The inflorescence is a series of clusters of flowers located at each leaf pair. Each flower has a hairy calyx of pointed sepals and a tubular, lipped purple corolla. The four curved stamens protrude from the lips of the flower.

References

External links
Calflora Database: Trichostema oblongum (Mountain bluecurls,  Oblong bluecurls)
Jepson Manual eFlora (TJM2) treatment of Trichostema oblongum
 USDA Plants Profile for Trichostema oblongum (oblong bluecurls)
UC Photos gallery: Trichostema oblongum

oblongum
Flora of Western Canada
Flora of the Southwestern United States
Flora of the Northwestern United States
Flora of the Cascade Range
Flora of the Sierra Nevada (United States)
Natural history of the California Coast Ranges
Taxa named by George Bentham
Flora without expected TNC conservation status